Curitiba-President Afonso Pena  International Airport  is the main airport serving Curitiba, located in municipality of São José dos Pinhais, in the state of Paraná. It is named after Afonso Pena (1847–1909), the 6th President of Brazil.

It is operated by CCR.

History

As was the case with many important Brazilian airports located in strategic points along the coast, Afonso Pena, was built by the Brazilian Air Force Ministry in partnership with the United States Army during the Second World War. However, since its construction was completed only in 1945, shortly before the end of the war, Afonso Pena never saw heavy military movement. In 1946, most of its movement comprised civil operations.
The original passenger terminal was in use until 1959 when a new terminal was built. This second terminal is today used for cargo operations. In 1996, the present passenger terminal was built.

The main problem of the airport are the unstable weather conditions of the region, particularly fog and smog in the morning hours of winter and the fact that the auxiliary runway 11/29 is too small and plagued with old equipment. There are also plans to upgrade runway 15/33 from an ILS CAT II runway to ILS CAT III.
Since the bottleneck for the airport is the cargo capacity, the main runway was lengthened in 2008 to allow cargo flights to operate with greater loads and the cargo terminal was upgraded.

On 31 August 2009, Infraero unveiled a BRL30 million (USD16 million; EUR11 million) investment plan to upgrade Afonso Pena International Airport focusing on the preparations for the 2014 FIFA World Cup which were held in Brazil, Curitiba being one of the venue cities. The investment included the enlargement of the apron and implementation of taxiways. The terminal is 45,000 m2, has 14 jetways, and is capable of handling 15 million passengers annually. There are 800 parking places. The airport complex includes a small museum, a playcenter and a mall with 60 stores inside the main terminal.

According to AirHelp, it was listed as the 4th best airport in the world in 2019.

Previously operated by Infraero, on April 7, 2021, CCR won a 30-year concession to operate the airport.

Airlines and destinations

Passenger

Cargo

Statistics

Source:

Accidents and incidents
16 June 1958: a Cruzeiro do Sul Convair 440-59, registration PP-CEP, flying from Florianópolis to Curitiba, was on final approach procedures to land at Curitiba in bad weather when it was caught in windshear. The aircraft descended and struck the ground. Of the 27 passengers and crew aboard, 24 died. Among the deaths was the Brazilian interim president at that time, Nereu Ramos.
3 November 1967: a Sadia Handley Page Dart Herald 214, registration PP-SDJ, flying from São Paulo-Congonhas to Curitiba, collided with a hill during approach to land at Curitiba. All 5 crew members and 21 passengers died. 4 passengers survived.
16 August 2000: a VASP Boeing 737-2A1 registration PP-SMG, en route from Foz do Iguaçu to Curitiba, was hijacked by 5 persons demanding the BRL 5 million (approximately US$2.75 million at that time) that the aircraft was transporting. The pilot was forced to land at Porecatu, where the hijackers fled with the money. There were no injuries.
26 December 2002: a Brazilian Air Force Embraer EMB 110 Bandeirante, registration FAB-2292, en route from São Paulo-Campo de Marte to Florianópolis Air Force Base, crashed while trying to carry out an emergency landing at Curitiba-Afonso Pena. Reportedly, both engines had shut down. The airplane had taken off with insufficient fuel on board to complete the flight to Florianópolis. Of the 16 people on board, 1 crew member and 2 passengers died.

Access

See also

List of airports in Brazil

References

External links

Airports in Paraná (state)
Airports established in 1945
Transport in Curitiba